Frierfjorden is a fjord in the Grenland traditional district in the county of Telemark, Norway. It is an arm of the Langesundsfjord and well into the 1700s was also known as the Langesundsfjord. Frierfjorden stretches from the opening to Langesundsfjord in the south to the mouth of the Porsgrunn River in the north. The much smaller fjord of Gunneklevfjord opens into the Porsgrunn/Skien River and is separated from Frierfjorden by the peninsula of Herøya. 

Frierfjorden narrows to a width of about 300 m at its mouth, Breviksstrømmen, where the town of Brevik sits on the northern side and Stathelle on the southern side. The Brevik Bridge crosses Breviksstrømmen between the two towns. A little further into the fjord the newer Grenland Bridge crosses the fjord, carrying the E18 highway across Norway's highest cable stayed bridge.

Frierfjord has a great deal of commercial ship traffic, including to Rafnes, near Herre, in Bamble, Norsk Hydro in Porsgrunn and formerly to Norske Skog Union in Skien.

The name Frier originally comes from the old Norse and means beautiful.

Porsgrunn
Fjords of Vestfold og Telemark
Skagerrak